Phlogophora calamistrata is a species of moth of the family Noctuidae first described by Frederic Moore in 1882. It is found in India.

References

Hadeninae